نفس الإنسان هي كيانه، وروحه، وهي مربوطة بالجسد، فلا جسد دون نفس، ولا نفس دون جسد، وهي معنوية لا تحس، وهي تشمل المشاعر، والأحاسيس، والتفكير، وكلا منا مسؤول عن نفسه فيما يعطيها من اهتمام، أي أن يكون كريم مع نفسه بالعلم، والثقافة، أن يقدر نفسه ويحترمها، فهو بذلك يفرض احترامه أمام الجميع، فإنّ من حق نفسك عليك أن تؤمن بها لتبدع، أن تكرمها لتنجز لك ما تتمنى، 	الزهد ليس بتحريم الحلال، ولا بترك الطيبات، هو تجرد القلب، والروح من حظوظ النفس. في الوعي تجد مساحة السلام مع النفس، ومع الآخر، والتي ترى الأشياء على حقيقتها. وما الفرق بين الخيال والواقع، وكلاھما طيف عابر لقي ظله على النفس ثمّ اختفى من عالم الحس بعد لحظات. ينبع الرضا، والتصالح مع النفس من علمنا أننا نفعل الشيء الصحيح الذي يرضي الله عز وجل. فإذا كان الله هو الرزاق فلم يتملق البشر، ولم تهان النفس في سبيل الرزق لأجل البشر. الجسد مظلة تحيط بالنفس مظلة تتلقى أشعة الشمس الحارقة، فتكتوي بها، وتمنعها عن النفس. بشيء من التضحية وشيء من التخلي عن حظوظ النفس يمكن للمرء أن يكون سنداً لشخص واحد على الأقل. لقد قال لي مراراً إنّ أفضل طريقة للتعامل مع الظنون هي في كتمانها، ومحاصرتها داخل النفس. الانتحار كلمة سيئة التشكيل، الشخص الذي يَقتل ليس نفس الشخص الذي يُقتل. الزهد ليس بتحريم الحلال، ولا بترك الطيبات، هو تجرد القلب، والروح من حظوظ النفس. في الوعي تجد مساحة السلام مع النفس، ومع الآخر، والتي ترى الأشياء على حقيقتها. وما الفرق بين الخيال والواقع، وكلاھما طيف عابر لقي ظله على النفس ثمّ اختفى من عالم الحس بعد لحظات. ينبع الرضا، والتصالح مع النفس من علمنا أننا نفعل الشيء الصحيح الذي يرضي الله عز وجل. فإذا كان الله هو الرزاق فلم يتملق البشر، ولم تهان النفس في سبيل الرزق لأجل البشر. الجسد مظلة تحيط بالنفس مظلة تتلقى أشعة الشمس الحارقة، فتكتوي بها، وتمنعها عن النفس. بشيء من التضحية وشيء من التخلي عن حظوظ النفس يمكن للمرء أن يكون سنداً لشخص واحد على الأقل. لقد قال لي مراراً إنّ أفضل طريقة للتعامل مع الظنون هي في كتمانها، ومحاصرتها داخل النفس. الانتحار كلمة سيئة التشكيل، الشخص الذي يَقتل ليس نفس الشخص الذي يُقتل.

John William Somerville-Hendrie (born 22 June 1983) is an English cricketer. Somerville-Hendrie is a right-handed batsman who bowls right-arm medium-fast. He was born in Hillingdon, London.

While studying for his degree at Durham University, Somerville-Hendrie made his first-class debut for Durham UCCE against Durham in 2003. He made three further first-class appearances for the university, the last of which came against Derbyshire in 2004. In his four first-class matches, he scored 31 runs at an average of 10.33, with a high score of 23. With the ball, he took 8 wickets at a bowling average of 44.75, with best figures of 3/51.

References

External links
John Somerville-Hendrie at ESPNcricinfo
John Somerville-Hendrie at CricketArchive

1983 births
Living people
People from Hillingdon
English cricketers
Durham MCCU cricketers
Alumni of Stephenson College, Durham